In enzymology, a hyponitrite reductase is an enzyme that catalyzes the oxidation of hydroxylamine  by the nicotinamide adenine dinucleotide cation (NAD+) into hyponitrous acid HON=NOH:
2  + 2 NAD+  HON=NOH + 2 NADH + 2 H+
This systematic name of this enzyme class hydroxylamine:NAD+ oxidoreductase.  It is also called NADH2:hyponitrite oxidoreductase.

This enzyme belongs to the family of oxidoreductases, specifically those acting on other nitrogenous compounds as donors with NAD+ or NADP+ as acceptor.  It employs one cofactor, metal.

References

 

EC 1.7.1
NADH-dependent enzymes
Metal enzymes
Enzymes of unknown structure